Yellows may refer to:

 Shades of yellow
 Yellow

Butterflies
 Coliadinae
 Clouded yellows, a common name for Colias, a genus of butterflies
 Grass yellows, a common name for Eurema, a genus of butterflies

Phytoplasmas and phytoplasma-related diseases
 Aster yellows, a yellowing disease that affects plants in the aster family
 Elm yellows, a yellowing disease that affects elm trees
 Grapevine yellows, a yellowing disease that affects grape plants
 Milkweed yellows phytoplasma, a phytoplasma that infects milkweeds

Plant viruses
 Abutilon yellows virus, a plant virus that is transmitted by a fly
 Beet yellows virus, a plant virus that causes a yellowing disease in various species of beet and spinach
 Cucumber yellows virus, a plant virus that causes a yellowing disease in various species of cucumber and melon

See also
 Yellow (disambiguation)